Hiregunjal is a village in Dharwad district of Karnataka, India.

Demographics 
As of the 2011 Census of India there were 532 households in Hiregunjal and a total population of 2,199 consisting of 1,080 males and 1,119 females. There were 250 children ages 0–6.

References

Villages in Dharwad district